Kentroleuca is a genus of moths in the family Saturniidae first described by Max Wilhelm Karl Draudt in 1930.

Species
The genus includes the following species:

Kentroleuca albilinea (Schaus, 1908)
Kentroleuca boliviensis Brechlin & Meister, 2002
Kentroleuca brunneategulata Mielke & Furtado, 2006
Kentroleuca dukinfieldi (Schaus, 1894)
Kentroleuca griseoalbata Mielke & Furtado, 2006
Kentroleuca lineosa (Walker, 1855)
Kentroleuca novaholandensis Lemaire & C. Mielke, 2001
Kentroleuca spitzi Lemaire, 1971

References

Hemileucinae